Party City Holdco Inc. is an American publicly traded retail chain of party stores founded in 1986 by Steve Mandell in East Hanover, New Jersey. Party City's parent company is Party City Holdings Inc. Based in Woodcliff Lake, New Jersey, the company is the largest retailer of party goods in the United States, Canada, and Mexico, operating over 750 company-owned and franchise outlets under the Party City, Halloween City, Toy City, and Factory Card & Party Outlet brands.

History

1986–1993: Founding and franchising

Party City was founded by Steve Mandell in 1986, Mandell recognized that the market for party goods was highly fragmented with a lot of small mom-and-pop operations, a large number of retailers carrying limited supplies, and no big players dominating the party goods market. Mandell decided to specialize in the business when he struck out on his own to realize his long-cherished goal of running his own retail operation. After scraping together $125,000, he opened a  store in East Hanover, New Jersey, naming it Party City. The operation was immediately successful and within a year Mandell started planning for a second location. He also began to hear from people asking to franchise the Party City concept, and as a result Party City began its evolution into a national chain. After his first year in business Mandell also decided to concentrate on Halloween, so that in 1987 over a quarter of his store was turned into a "Halloween Costume Warehouse". The move proved highly successful and led to the company's ongoing focus on the holiday, and the major impact that the month of October would have on the company's bottom line. Year-round, Party City stocked an inventory of Halloween costumes, if for no other reason than to make customers aware of the items for the next Halloween season. One quarter ($560 million) of Party City's 2015 revenue came from Halloween; the company operates about 300 Halloween City pop-up stores.

Party City started franchising in 1989 in Hazlet, New Jersey, and by 1990 Mandell also owned four Party City stores. At this point he incorporated the business as a franchising operation, with his stores forming the core of the chain. By the end of 1990, Party City outlets numbered 11; five more franchised stores were added in 1991, 16 in 1992, and another 26 in 1993, bringing the total to 58. Party City was now a nationwide chain with store locations ranging from Hawaii to Puerto Rico. The company's annual revenues in 1993 topped $2.4 million and net profits approached $235,000. During these first four years of operation, Mandell refined the Party City concept, including store design, product mix, choice of suppliers, and the implementation of systems. With a successful store model in hand, Mandell in late 1993 decided to de-emphasize franchising in favor of opening company-owned stores, which would generate greater returns for the corporation than it could receive on fees and royalties from franchised outlets, as well as allow Mandell to better control the destiny of Party City. While franchisees might maintain a tighter control on inventory, Mandell was insistent that company-owned units would be amply stocked with a wide range of merchandise.

2005–2022: Acquisitions and developments

In 2005, the company was sold to a subsidiary of AAH Holdings Corporation, owner of Amscan, a designer, manufacturer and distributor of party goods in America. Amscan then went on to acquire the party retailers Party America in 2006 and Factory Card & Party Outlet in 2007. Both retail chains began to operate under the Party City network, thereby making Party City the largest party supplies retailer in the United States.

With Amscan's 2011 acquisition of American Greetings' Designware party division, Party City added licensing agreements with Nickelodeon, Sesame Workshop, and Hasbro. In 2011, Amscan became a licensee for MLB, NBA, NFL, NHL and NCAA party products and balloons, and Party City carries all teams in their respective markets and offers the entire assortment in larger stores and online.

In 2011, Party City expanded outside the United States with the acquisition of the Canadian retailer Party Packagers, making Party City the largest party goods retailer in North America. In 2012, these stores began to re-brand as Party City. In 2013, Party City bought iParty. In December 2017, Party City acquired MG Novelty Corporation for around $5.5 million, which operated seven retail stores under the name Party Galaxy in the Oklahoma City metropolitan area. In 2017, Party City purchased its franchised locations in the Carolinas.

Advent International, Berkshire Partners LLC and Weston Presidio in 2012 sold Thomas H. Lee Partners a majority stake in Party City. In 2015, Party City Holdco Inc went public with Thomas H. Lee Partners retaining 55% and Advent International owned 19 percent. In April 2017, the company was approached by a private equity firm to acquire the company. In response the company placed itself on the market.In June 2018, Party City announced that it would open around 50 Toy City pop-up stores beginning in September 2018, alongside its Halloween City stores. The stores operated through the conclusion of the holiday season, and was meant to capitalize upon the closure of the U.S. locations of Toys "R" Us. Some of its locations utilized vacancies created by the Toys "R" Us shutdown.

In May 2019, it was announced that the chain would be closing 45 locations "to help optimize our market-level performance, focus on the most profitable locations, and improve the overall health of our store portfolio".

Party City's Canadian operations were acquired by Canadian Tire in August 2019 for $174.4 million CAD.
Party City’s parent organization is Party City Holdings Inc.

2023–present: Bankruptcy and restructuring 
In early 2023, rumors surfaced the company had intention to file for Chapter 11 bankruptcy in the United States. Party City Holdco Inc. filed for bankruptcy on January 17, 2023, weighed down by a confluence of factors including the pandemic and changing consumer behavior. The move is part of an attempt to restructure and reduce the company's debt. The company secured $150 million in financing that will allow it to keep its stores open and operations running. The move will help the company complete an "expedited restructuring" to reduce its debt that should be done by the second quarter of 2023.

References

External links

See also
Smiffys
Jakks
Amscan

Party stores of the United States
American companies established in 1986
Retail companies established in 1986
2015 initial public offerings
Rockaway, New Jersey
Companies based in Morris County, New Jersey
Companies listed on the New York Stock Exchange
1986 establishments in New Jersey
Companies that filed for Chapter 11 bankruptcy in 2023